The West Anglia Main Line is one of the two main lines that operate out of  (the other being the Great Eastern Main Line to Ipswich and Norwich). The line runs along the boundary between Hertfordshire and Essex for much of its length.

In the early years, the line was the main route from London to Cambridge. It was an important goods route for many years as the southern end of a route from coalfields in Yorkshire, and there are still freight trains which run occasionally to Harlow and Rye House Power Station, along with a Network Rail base at Broxbourne.

For details on the routes in the London area, refer to the Lea Valley Lines article.

History
It was extended northwards in stages, reaching Spellbrook,  short of Bishops Stortford, in 1842. In 1843 the line reached , and in the following year the Northern and Eastern Railway was leased by the Eastern Counties Railway.

By the 1860s the railways in East Anglia were in financial trouble, and most were leased to the Eastern Counties Railway. Although  they wished to amalgamate formally, they could not obtain government agreement for this until 1862, when the Great Eastern Railway (GER) was formed by amalgamation.

The opening of the Great Northern and Great Eastern Joint Railway in 1882 saw the Great Eastern open up a direct link with coal-producing areas in Nottinghamshire and South Yorkshire joining the line north of Cambridge at Chesterton Junction, generally routed to the large marshalling yards at Temple Mills.

Following the grouping in 1923 the line became part of the London & North Eastern Railway.

In 1948 following nationalisation the line passed to British Railways Eastern Region.

In 1952 the branch from Elsenham to Thaxted (known as the "Gin & Toffee Line") closed to passengers, and goods services were withdrawn a year later. The Saffron Walden line closed to passengers on 7 September 1964 and to freight three months later.

Electrification first came in the early 1960s under British Rail in sections. Electrification to Chingford included the Stratford – Lea Bridge – Hall Farm Junction section (although this was never completed), and the line from Liverpool Street to Broxbourne via Seven Sisters and the Southbury Loop was electrified. The route via Tottenham Hale was still operated by diesel traction, the British Rail Class 125 'Lea Valley' DMUs.

The line from Clapton Junction (on the Chingford line) through Tottenham Hale to Cheshunt and from Broxbourne to Bishops Stortford was electrified on 9 March 1969  and from there to Cambridge in 1987. Stratford to Coppermill Junction was electrified in 1989. The power supply is 25 kV AC overhead line.

In 1991, a single-track branch line to Stansted Airport was opened, and services to London Liverpool Street commenced.

However, the class 720 has selective door opening, allowing for some platforms not having to be extended.

Services
Services from Liverpool Street to Cambridge, Hertford East and Stansted Airport are operated by Greater Anglia.

Express services from Liverpool Street to Stansted Airport are operated by Stansted Express, a sub-brand of Greater Anglia.

Services from Stansted Airport to Cambridge (and onward to  via ) are operated by CrossCountry.

The line is part of the Network Rail Strategic Route 5, which comprises SRS 05.01 and part of 05.05. It is classified as a London and South East commuter line.

In London, the line forms the Tottenham Hale branch of the Lea Valley Lines.

The weekday services on the mainline are as follows:

Infrastructure

The line is electrified at 25 kV AC and has a loading gauge of W8 except for the Stansted branch, which is W6.

Line-side train monitoring equipment includes hot axle box detectors (HABD) on the up main south of Newport (39 miles 48 chains from Liverpool Street) and on the down main north of Shepreth Branch Junction (53 miles 10 chains). There are no wheel impact load detectors (WILD) ‘Wheelchex’ on the line.

Tunnels and viaducts 
Major civil engineering structures on the West Anglia Main Line include the following.

Locomotives and rolling stock

Throughout the steam era trains were predominantly hauled by Great Eastern Railway (or its constituent companies') locomotives: when steam ended in East Anglia in the 1960s some of these locomotives were still operated – see Stratford TMD and Great Eastern Railway. After the grouping of 1923 LNER-designed locomotives were used with the B17 4-6-0 class working many main line services. Following nationalisation in 1948 British Railways introduced the Britannia 4-6-2 class on some main line services until succeeded by diesels in the late 1950s.

East Anglia was the first area to be worked completely by diesel trains with Class 31s taking over some express workings.  These were succeeded by more powerful Class 37 and Class 47 until full electrification to King's Lynn in the 1980s when Class 86 locomotives took over.

Suburban services from about 1958 were operated by Class 125 DMUs, and following the 1969 electrification Class 305 and Class 308 units. Other units from the GE section such as Class 302 and 306 also operated services during this period, with Class 310s temporarily operating once electrification to Cambridge was complete. These first-generation units were replaced soon after by Class 315 and Class 317 units.

In 2011, new Bombardier Class 379s began operation mainly to replace class 317 from Stansted Express duties to mainline  services (which in-turn relocated class 315s to inner suburban routes). Class 170 DMUs operate from Stansted Airport north through Cambridge to Birmingham on CrossCountry services. In 2020, new Class 745s were introduced on Stansted Express services, cascading the Class 379s to other WAML services. It is expected that both these and the delayed Class 720s will replace both class 317s & class 379s on the route by 2022.

Future developments

It seems likely that two tracks will be built alongside the line to Cheshunt as part of Crossrail 2. Intermediate stations from Tottenham Hale will transfer to Crossrail 2 releasing capacity on the mainline for additional trains. In August 2019, it was announced that funding had been approved for four-tracking and related platform construction work between Tottenham Hale and Meridian Water to enable up to 8 trains per hour to make local stops in this section at peak times.

References

Rail transport in Cambridgeshire
Rail transport in Essex
Rail transport in Hertfordshire
Railway lines in London
Railway lines in the East of England
Standard gauge railways in England
5 ft gauge railways in the United Kingdom
Rail transport in Cambridge